Shirley Gnome is a Canadian singer and comedian from Vancouver, British Columbia. Best known as a singer of comedy songs about taboo topics such as sexuality, she received a Juno Award nomination for Comedy Album of the Year at the Juno Awards of 2021 for her 2020 album Decoxification.

Gnome grew up in Surrey, British Columbia, a place she describes as “a big place with a lot of contradictions. From the south you could smell the salty sea air. From the north you could hear gunshots and sirens".

Her other albums have included Ho Down (2010), C*untry Music (2012), The Lady of the Night (2015) and Taking It Up the Notch (2017). Her first three releases were independent before signing with the Vancouver based label 604 Records.  Her style has evolved from country music toward a diverse blend of country, rock and electronic pop.

She describes her music as “little lullabies about things we think about, but don’t talk about. With the intent to reveal that at the end of the day, it’s not really a big deal”.

She is also a four-time Canadian Comedy Award nominee for Best Variety Act, receiving nods at the 15th Canadian Comedy Awards in 2014, the 16th Canadian Comedy Awards in 2015, the 18th Canadian Comedy Awards in 2018 and the 19th Canadian Comedy Awards in 2019. In 2018, she also received a nomination for Best Comedy Album, for Taking It Up the Notch.

References

External links

21st-century Canadian comedians
21st-century Canadian women singers
Canadian comedy musicians
Canadian women comedians
Musicians from Vancouver
Living people
Year of birth missing (living people)
Comedians from Vancouver